Albert Craig may refer to:

 Albert M. Craig (born 1927), American professor of Japanese history
 Albert Craig (rhymester) (1849–1909), English writer of cricket verse, known as "The Surrey Poet"
 Albert Craig (footballer) (born 1962), Scottish former footballer
Albert "Apple Gabriel" Craig, former member of Jamaican vocal trio Israel Vibration